The Martyrdom of St Sebastian is a 1505 fresco painting by Perugino in the church of San Sebastiano in Panicale. It shows the martyrdom of St Sebastian in an ancient Roman setting, with God the Father in a tondo above.

References

Church frescos in Italy
Paintings by Pietro Perugino
1505 paintings
Perugino
Panicale